William Henry Morris (January 1, 1861 – January 11, 1936) was an American stage and film actor.

Career 

He began his career as a teenager in the theater, first appearing at the Boston Museum in 1875. He became a star on the Broadway stage, where he spent most of his career. He appeared in popular plays such as 1909's Is Matrimony a Failure? He was a character actor in silent films, usually playing gruff fathers or bad guys.

His appearance in Alice Guy's 1917 silent film The Ocean Waif, from Kino DVD, is an example of Morris's surviving screen work.

Personal life 

He was married to actress Etta Hawkins, with whom he had five children: screenwriter-actor Gordon Morris (1898–1940), actors Chester Morris (1901–1970) and Adrian Morris (1907–1941), and actress Wilhelmina Morris (1902–1971). Their first child, Lloyd Morris, died young (1892–1902).

Selected filmography

Selected stage appearances
 Men and Women (1890)
 Is Matrimony a Failure? (1909)
 The Concert (1910)
 The Family Cupboard (1913)
 Cheating Cheaters (1916)

References

External links

1861 births
1936 deaths
Male actors from Boston
American male stage actors
American male film actors